Opposition to Christianity in Chazalic literature consists of direct questioning and at times invalidating of Christianity as found in Chazalic literature. Of the notable reasons of Chazalic opposition to Christianity is that Christianity is founded on the belief of the Trinity, whereas Judaism follows the belief of unitarian monotheism. Another source of opposition is the belief that the Torah, as given by Moses, along with its interpretation by Chazal, is the supreme and exclusive indicator of Yahweh's instruction to Jews and mankind.

Mishnaic sources

Tosefta
References to Christianity are rarely found in Tosefta. A brief mention—albeit allegorically—is found in regards to a Jew who incises his skin on the Shabbat with the intent to engrave a tattoo. the Tanna Rabbi Eliezer is quoted as liableizing (for transgression of Shabbat) the offender for performing one of the activities prohibited on Shabbat, as this is a form of writing. As proof, Rabbi Eliezer cites that "Ben Sitda" stole his knowledge of sorcery from Egypt using this type of writing -hence proving its potency as a viable form of writing. Chazal did not accept Rabbi Eliezer's proof, with the counterclaim of "due to one shoteh (fool) we should make liable all the normal folk?"

Following the debated assumption that Ben Sitida is indeed a reference to Jesus, it is inferable from this mentioning that Jesus -as founder of Christianity- was believed to have used sorcery as a method of achieving supernatural events -a method discounted by Chazal as illegitimate.

Midrashic sources
Midrashic literature contains a number of references to Christianity. Of note is the Midrash's insistence that the rise of Christianity—as well as its illegitimacy as being of service to Yahweh—was foretold to all nations of mankind by Bilaam the sorcerer:
{{quote|Rabbi Yehoshua ben Levi says; Seventy nations heard the voice of Bilaam. Rabbi Elazer the Kappar  says;  God gave strength to his (Bilaam's) voice and it travelled from the edge of the world to its (other) edge. Since he viewed and saw the nations that they bow to the Sun and the Moon and stars, to wood and stone -and viewed and saw that there is a man -the son of a woman- that in the future will stand and will seek to make himself a god -to trick the entire world. Thus, (God) gave (super-natural) strength to his voice so that all nations of the world should hear. Likewise he (Bilaam) stated; "give your attention in order that you not err after that man" as it is stated "God is not man -who err's", (thus) if he states that he is a god he is tricking (causing to err). And in the future he will state that he is the son of god. But (in actuality) is only the son of man, as is stated "and the son of man to change" since he will -in the future- misrepresent and say that he is passing on and will come in return; "he said and will not do". Look what is written; "he (Bilaam) carried his parable and said "Oh! who will live from (the sin of) placing him as a G-d?" -said Bilaam, Woe! who will live from that nation that followed after that man that presented himself as a God.|Yalkut Shimoni to Numbers page 400 (Ha'Maor edition)}}

Midrash HaGadol
As the featured Midrashic text of Yemenite Jewry, the Midrash ha-Gadol—in relation to Yeshu—cites the ideal state of Judaism as that where no students or members of the religion "step out" and publicly profess the Rabbinic interpretation of the Torah as invalid.

The Zohar
In the Zohar, Rabbi Shimon bar Yochai is reported as exclaiming dissatisfaction to those whi forgo the Torah in favor of its antitheses:

Talmudic sources

The Talmud—relative to other Rabbinic sources—takes a unique approach to Christianity in the sense that in differentiates between Yeshu himself—who is portrayed as a complete Jew wanting to remain under his Rabbi's tutelage—and the religion he ultimately established -which the Talmud frowns upon.

In Sanhedrin 107b and Sotah 47a'' Yeshu is mentioned as a student of Yehoshua ben Perachya who was sent away for misinterpreting a word that in context should have been understood as referring to the Inn, he instead understood it to mean the innkeeper's wife. His teacher said "Here is a nice Inn", to which he replied "Her eyes are crooked", to which his teacher responded "Is this what your are occupied in?"  After several returns for forgiveness he mistook Perachiah's signal to wait a moment as a signal of final rejection, and so he turned to idolatry;

Tzoah rotachat

Ben Sitida and Ben Pandira

See also
 Judaism's view of Jesus
 Jesus in the Talmud

References

Anti-Christian sentiment in Asia
Christianity and Judaism related controversies
Rabbinic literature